César Elías Santis Santander (born 5 February 1979) is a Chilean former professional footballer who played as a left-back.

Career
He played for Unión Española (1996–98, 2002–03), Espanyol (1998–2000), Real Murcia (2001–02), Everton de Viña del Mar (2004–05), Deportes Antofagasta (2006) and Audax Italiano (2006–09).

In March 2007 he played in a Copa Libertadores match for Audax, against Necaxa.

Santis made an appearance for the Chile national team in a friendly match versus Bolivia in 28 April 1999.

Honours
Espanyol
 Copa del Rey: 1999-00

References

External links
 
 
 César Santis at PlaymakerStats

1979 births
Living people
Footballers from Santiago
Chilean footballers
Chile international footballers
Association football fullbacks
Chilean Primera División players
Unión Española footballers
Everton de Viña del Mar footballers
C.D. Antofagasta footballers
Audax Italiano footballers
La Liga players
RCD Espanyol footballers
Segunda División players
Real Murcia players
Chilean expatriate footballers
Chilean expatriate sportspeople in Spain
Expatriate footballers in Spain